Clans of Ireland (Irish: Finte na hÉireann) is an independent organisation established in 1989 with the purpose of creating and maintaining a register of Irish clans. The patron of the organisation is Michael D. Higgins, President of Ireland.

Background and foundation

The influence of the Gaelic League (formed in 1893 as Conradh na Gaeilge) "rekindled" an interest in Irish clans in the early 20th century. In the 1940s, Edward MacLysaght, the Chief Herald of Ireland, wrote a list of Irish clans and published several works on the history and background of Irish families.

During the late 1980s, Rory O'Connor wrote to Irish newspapers and individuals, encouraging the organisation of Irish clan associations. On 6 November 1989, a press conference was held in Dublin to announce the opening of an umbrella body for these clan associations, Clans of Ireland (Finte na hÉireann). The purpose of the new body was to support and co-ordinate the activities of these clan associations and to create a "Register of Clans".

Organisation
The board of directors of Clans of Ireland meets several times each year at the Chapter House in Christ Church Cathedral in Dublin. In 2012, Michael D. Higgins, President of Ireland, became patron of Clans of Ireland.

Order of Clans of Ireland
In 2010, the 21st anniversary of its foundation, Clans of Ireland instituted the Order of Clans of Ireland, an order of merit established to honour individuals who contributed to Irish culture and heritage or who have brought honour to their clan.

Structure and appointment

An invitation for nominations is sent each September to all clans which have "maintained their registration with Clans of Ireland for three consecutive years or more". As of 2021, the Clans of Ireland website indicated that "no more than four individuals can receive the award each year".

The order is administered by a council who are appointed by the board of Clans of Ireland. The order's statutes dictate that three members of council, including the chair must be drawn from the board of Clans of Ireland and a further two must be independent. Once appointed, the order's council is autonomous in its decisions and feedback is not given on unsuccessful nominations. The order's council convenes each Spring to consider the nominations received. The names of the successful nominations are published on 17 March (St. Patrick's Day). Recipients have sometimes been inducted at a ceremony in Dublin in April when they have received their insignia. Inductees are designated as Companions of the Order of Clans of Ireland or in Irish Compánach Fhinte na hÉireann and may use the post-nominal letters CIOM.

Insignia

The order's insignia was designed by heraldic artist Tim O'Neill, who also worked on a number of commissions for the Office of the Chief Herald of Ireland. The insignia consists of a gold medal under an azure blue ribbon on a gold bar. One side of the medal is styled after the Book of Kells and shows a chieftain passing a light to two younger figures, while the reverse shows a traditional Irish harp.

Companions of the Order (Members)

Appointments to the order are made each year, and presentations made at a ceremony sometimes overseen by a related dignitary. For example, a number of 2013 conferrings were presented by the then Minister for Arts, Heritage and the Gaeltacht at the Irish Embassy in Italy.

From 2011 to 2020, between one and seven appointments were made to the order annually. There were no appointments to the order in 2015. Notable past inductees have included:

 (2011) James O'Higgins Norman, author and academic at Dublin City University
 (2012) Michael D. Higgins, President of Ireland
 (2012) Nollaig Ó Muraíle RIA, author and academic at NUIG who transcribed and translated MacFhirbhisigh's Great Book of Irish Genealogies
 (2013) Mary McAleese, President of Ireland 1997–2011.
 (2013) Pádraig Ó Fiannachta,  Irish-language scholar, poet and priest.

See also
Standing Council of Irish Chiefs and Chieftains
Irish honours system

References

External links

Irish clans